The 2000–01 Greek Basket League season was the 61st season of the Greek Basket League, the highest tier professional basketball league in Greece. It was also the 9th season of Greek Basket League championship that was regulated by HEBA (ESAKE). The winner of the league was Panathinaikos, which beat Olympiacos in the league's playoff's finals. The clubs Milon and Makedonikos were relegated to the Greek A2 League. The top scorer of the league was Alphonso Ford, a player of Peristeri. Alphonso Ford was also named the MVP of the league.

Teams

Regular season

Source: esake.gr, galanissportsdata.com

Playoffs

Positions 1-6

Positions 7-12

The finals

Final standings

Top Players

References

External links
 Official HEBA Site
 Official Hellenic Basketball Federation Site
   HEBA Site, season 2000/01
  Galanis Sports Data 

Greek Basket League seasons
1
Greek